Richard E. Morley (December 1, 1932 – October 17, 2017) was an American mechanical engineer who was considered one of the "fathers" of the programmable logic controller (PLC) since he was involved with the production of the first PLC for General Motors, the Modicon, at Bedford and Associates in 1968. The Modicon brand of PLC is now owned by Schneider Electric. The PLC has been recognized as a significant advancement in the practice of automation, and has an important influence on manufacturing.

Biography
He was born in Clinton, Massachusetts, in 1932 and attended the Massachusetts Institute of Technology.

Legacy
An inventor, machinist, author, consultant and engineer, his peers have acknowledged his contributions with numerous awards from groups such as the International Society of Automation (ISA), the Instrumentation Systems and Automation Society, Inc. magazine, the Franklin Institute, the Society of Manufacturing Engineers (SME) and the Engineering Society of Detroit. He was also inducted into the Manufacturing Hall of Fame.

SME offers the Richard E. Morley Outstanding Young Manufacturing Engineer Award for outstanding technical accomplishments in the manufacturing profession by engineers age 35 and under.

Morley worked out of his barn in New Hampshire where he and his wife had provided a home to 40 foster children. He died on October 17, 2017, in New Hampshire.

Awards
 2016 Inducted into the Measurement, Control & Automation Hall of Fame by the Measurement, Control & Automation Association (MCAA)
 2016 Control System Integrators Association (CSIA) Lifetime Achievement Award
 2007–2008 SME Manufacturing Enterprise Council Member
 2006–2008 NH Judge - Hi Tech Council Product of the Year
 2006 Process Automation Hall of Fame (Control magazine)
 2005 SME Board of Directors
 1996 Automation Hall of Fame Prometheus Award
 1995 SME Fellow
 1993 Parallel Processor Design — Flavors
 1991 Howard N. Potts Medal
 1990 Entrepreneur of the Year
 1981 Gould Science & Engineering Fellow
 Boeing Technical Excellence Award

See also
 Odo Josef Struger

References

External links
 Interview with Dick Morley
  The father of invention: Dick Morley looks back on the 40th anniversary of the PLC
 YouTube channel with stories by Dick Morley
 Morley obituary at WSJ, Nov. 10, 2017

1932 births
2017 deaths
American electrical engineers
20th-century American inventors
Howard N. Potts Medal recipients
Programmable logic controllers
People from Clinton, Massachusetts